Alan S. Rau is an American lawyer, previously the Mark G. and Judy G. Yudof Chair in Law at University of Texas School of Law, and also previously a Distinguished Professor at Queen Mary University of London and the Fred Paulus Chair in Public Policy and at Willamette University College.

References

Year of birth missing (living people)
Living people
University of Texas at Austin faculty
American lawyers
Harvard Law School alumni